George Eldon Ladd (July 31, 1911 – October 5, 1982) was a Baptist minister and professor of New Testament exegesis and theology at Fuller Theological Seminary in Pasadena, California, known in Christian eschatology for his promotion of inaugurated eschatology and "futuristic post-tribulationism."

Biography
Ladd was born in Alberta, Canada, and was raised in New England. He studied theology at Gordon College in Massachusetts, and was ordained in 1933 in the Northern Baptist Convention. He pastored churches in New Hampshire and Vermont while pursuing further education at Gordon Divinity School. Ladd served as an instructor at Gordon College of Theology and Missions (now Gordon-Conwell Theological Seminary), Wenham, Massachusetts from 1942–45. He was an associate professor of New Testament and Greek from 1946–50, and head of the department of New Testament from 1946–49. He studied at Harvard University during this period, completing a PhD dissertation on "The Eschatology of the Didache".

Ladd moved to California in 1950, and taught biblical theology at Fuller Theological Seminary, Pasadena. Fuller was in the fourth year of its existence when Ladd joined the faculty, and Hagner notes that  he "became one of the key figures in developing the seminary's direction."

Notable contributions to evangelical theology

New Testament theology
Ladd's best-known work, A Theology of the New Testament, has been used by thousands of seminary students since its publication in 1974. In a poll conducted by Mark Noll in 1986, this work ranked as the second most influential book among evangelical scholars, second only to Calvin's Institutes. A Theology of the New Testament was enhanced and updated by Donald A. Hagner in 1993. Ladd's belief in both present and future aspects of the Kingdom of God caused his detractors to critically compare his eschatological views to the amillennialism that was popular within Reformed theological circles.  Despite these comparisons, Ladd was not Reformed, and in fact rejected the Calvinistic view of the doctrine of salvation.

Inaugurated and premillennial eschatology
Ladd was a notable modern proponent of Historic Premillennialism, and often criticized dispensationalist views. This was notable during this period, as dispensationalism was by far the most widely held view among evangelicals during the mid-twentieth century.  His writings regarding the Kingdom of God (especially his view of inaugurated eschatology) have become a cornerstone of Kingdom theology. His perspective is expressed in R. G. Clouse, ed., 1977, The Meaning of the Millennium: Four Views (Downers Grove: InterVarsity Press) and the shorter and more accessible The Gospel of the Kingdom (Paternoster, 1959).

Recognition
John Piper uses Ladd's desire for scholarly credibility as a cautionary tale, and relates how Ladd "was almost undone emotionally and professionally" by Norman Perrin's critical review of Ladd's Jesus and the Kingdom. Piper goes on to describe how Ladd walked through the halls of Fuller shouting and waving a royalty check when A Theology of the New Testament was a stunning success ten years later.

In 1978, a Festschrift was published in his honour. Unity and Diversity in New Testament Theology: Essays in Honor of George E. Ladd, which included contributions by Leon Morris, William Barclay, F. F. Bruce, I. Howard Marshall, Richard Longenecker and Daniel Fuller.

Selected works

Books
 
 
 
 
 
 
 
  - original issued as Jesus and the Kingdom
  - originally published in small numbers in 1957

Articles and chapters

Citations

References
 .

External links
 TheologicalStudies.org.uk Bibliography of George Eldon Ladd's works - some available on-line

1911 births
1982 deaths
20th-century American male writers
20th-century American non-fiction writers
20th-century evangelicals
American male non-fiction writers
Evangelical theologians
Evangelical writers
Fuller Theological Seminary faculty
Gordon College (Massachusetts) alumni
Gordon College (Massachusetts) faculty
Gordon–Conwell Theological Seminary faculty
Harvard University alumni
New Testament scholars
People from Alberta
Premillennialism